Mission Community Church (formerly known as Superstition Springs Community Church) is an American, Non-Denominational, church located in Gilbert, Arizona that is well known for its extensive collaborations with various faith-based non-profit organizations in areas such as: sex trafficking rescue and rehabilitation, clean water and community building in Africa, and supporting local Arizona families suffering homelessness and hardship.

Service Times and Location 
The MISSION campus is located at 4450 E. Elliot Rd. in Gilbert, Arizona. As of December 2021, there are 2 service times at 9a and 1030a on Sunday mornings.

Justice Projects

Vision Abolition 
In 2007, MISSION Community Church teamed up with Homes of Hope "a non-profit organization created to help rescue and restore girls and women trafficked into sex slavery and sexual exploitation. Homes of Hope Fiji is a 43-acre village that provides long-term residential care for the rescued girls and their children and is the only place in all of the 300+ islands of Fiji that will house a girl who is pregnant, or has a child. They not only provide housing, but also food, clothing, medical and emotional care, education, and vocational training".

Vision Arizona 
In 2008, MISSION Community Church partnered with House of Refuge East (HRE) "a faith-based, non-profit organization helping homeless families and individuals in crisis by providing transitional housing and supportive services that assist participants as they strive toward self-sufficiency and seek to attain permanent housing. HRE consists of 88 two-bedroom homes and a Chapel/annex all located in a community setting. On any given day approximately 100 adults and 150 children call House of Refuge "home". Because greater than 50% of our residents come from shelters, this will often be the first safe home some children will have experienced".

Vision Africa 
In May 2007, MISSION Community Church in partnership with Somebody Cares. Since that time, MISSION has helped care for thousands of orphans in the village of Chikudzulire in the African nation of Malawi. Each December, the church takes a special offering to fund this project. In 2015, this project became known as Project ReGift.

Leadership

Mission Community Church is led by Kevin Rhineheimer, Lead Executive Pastor, and Landon MacDonald, Lead Teaching Pastor. Landon MacDonald is the son of controversial pastor James MacDonald. Landon previously worked at the church his father pastored, Harvest Bible Chapel, where he allegedly verbally abused volunteers and failed to report the abuse of a minor which Illinois pastors are mandated to do by law.

References

External links
 MISSION Community Church website

Non-denominational Evangelical churches
Churches in Arizona
Christian organizations established in 1995
Evangelical megachurches in the United States